Shelley Ann Gorman-Sandie (born 22 January 1969 in Melbourne, Victoria) is a retired female basketball player from Australia, who played for the Canberra Capitals. A three-time Olympian she was a member of the national women's team that claimed the bronze medal at the 1996 Summer Olympics in Atlanta, Georgia. She attended the Australian Institute of Sport in 1987.

In 2010, Sandie was elected to the Australian Basketball Hall of Fame.

See also
 WNBL Top Shooter Award
 WNBL All-Star Five

External links
Basketball Victoria Annual Report (p.29)
Basketball Australia Hall of Fame

References
Basketball-reference.com profile
FIBA Archive (1985 Junior Championship)
FIBA Archive (other competitions)

1969 births
Living people
Australian women's basketball players
Basketball players at the 1988 Summer Olympics
Basketball players at the 1996 Summer Olympics
Basketball players at the 2000 Summer Olympics
Olympic basketball players of Australia
Olympic bronze medalists for Australia
Sportswomen from Victoria (Australia)
Canberra Capitals players
Olympic medalists in basketball
Australian Institute of Sport basketball (WNBL) players
Basketball players from Melbourne
Medalists at the 1996 Summer Olympics
Olympic silver medalists for Australia